Several films have been released in the Digimon franchise. Of those films, two short films animated completely in CGI have never been screened outside Japan, while Digital Monster X-Evolution, which was not related to any of the Digimon television series, was first broadcast on television. The other films are primarily hand-drawn and related to the television series. The first three films were localized into English and compiled into a single film, Digimon: The Movie. Subsequent films up to Digimon Frontier: Island of Lost Digimon were also released in English as well. The Digimon Adventure tri. film series, whose films are streamed worldwide with English subtitles on the same day as they were released in Japanese theaters, were also later released in dubbed versions outside Japan.

Digimon Adventure films

Digimon Adventure 

Digimon Adventure is the first Digimon Adventure film. It was released in Japan on March 6, 1999. It was released in the United States on October 6, 2000, as the first part of Digimon: The Movie.

Our War Game! 

Digimon Adventure: Our War Game! is the second Digimon film. It was released in Japan on March 4, 2000. It was released in the United States on October 6, 2000, as the second part of Digimon: The Movie.

Digimon Hurricane Touchdown / Transcendent Evolution! The Golden Digimentals 

Digimon Adventure 02: Digimon Hurricane Touchdown!! / Transcendent Evolution!! The Golden Digimentals is a 2000 film and the third Digimon movie, released for the Toei Animation Summer 2000 Animation Fair. It was released in Japan on July 8, 2000. The film was screened in two parts, with Ojamajo Doremi #: The Movie screening in between. It was released in the United States on October 6, 2000, as the third part of Digimon: The Movie.

While T.K. and Kari visit Mimi in New York City, Wendigomon captures Tai, Matt, Sora, Izzy, Mimi, and Joe. The two enlist Davis, Yolei, Cody, and their Digimon to come to the United States to fight him. On the way, Davis and the others meet Willis, an American DigiDestined partnered with Terriermon. Willis reveals that he had two Digimon partners, the other being Kokomon, who had been corrupted by a virus. During battle, T.K. and Kari's Digimon, Seraphimon and Magnadramon, unlock two golden Digi-eggs for Davis and Willis to use, which Golden Armor Digivolves their partners into Magnamon and Rapidmon. The two defeat Wendigomon, allowing the older DigiDestined to return, and Davis' group returns to Japan. On the way home, Willis finds Kokomon's Digi-egg on the beach.

In the Japanese version of the films, Willis only appeared in Digimon Hurricane Touchdown!!/Supreme Evolution!! The Golden Digimentals (the basis for the segment "Present Day") and had no connection to the events depicted Digimon Adventure ("Eight Years Ago") and Our War Game! ("Four Years Later"). The English version rewrote Willis' backstory to include his involvement with Diaboromon to connect the movies together.

Digimon Adventure 3D: Digimon Grand Prix! 

Digimon Adventure 3D: Digimon Grand Prix! (デジモンアドベンチャー３Ｄ デジモングランプリ！, Dejimon Adobenchā Gurandopuri!) is a 7-minute CG film produced by Toei Animation that was originally screened at the Time Machine of Dreams theme park attraction at Sanrio Puroland from July 20, 2000 to June 23, 2002, and Harmonyland. It made its theatrical debut on October 3, 2009, alongside Digimon Savers 3D: The Digital World in Imminent Danger!, GeGeGe no Kitaro: Kitaro's Ghost Train and Yaemon, The Locomotive as part of the Burst Out! 3D Toei Anime Festival. It was released on DVD along with the other three films on February 21, 2010, under the name "CG Toei Anime Festival" and was later included on a bonus disc in the Digimon THE MOVIES Blu-ray 1999–2006 compilation, released on January 9, 2015.

Digimon: The Movie 

Digimon: The Movie is a compilation film with footage from the featurettes Digimon Adventure (1999), Digimon Adventure: Our War Game! (2000), and Digimon Adventure 02: Part 1: Digimon Hurricane Touchdown!!/Part 2: Supreme Evolution!! The Golden Digimentals (2000). It was released in the U.S. and Canada by Fox Kids on October 6, 2000.

Revenge of Diaboromon 

 is the fourth Digimon film. It was released in Japan on March 3, 2001, later released in the United States on August 5, 2005. Along with One Piece: Clockwork Island Adventure, the fourth Digimon film was shown as a double feature, which was called the Tōei Spring Anime Fair 2001. In total, they earned 3,000,000,000 Japanese yen.

Taking place three months after Digimon Adventure 02, the DigiDestined discover the return of Diaboromon. Tai, Matt, T.K. and Kari head to the Internet, where Diaboromon lures them into a trap. A swarm of Kuramon (Diaboromon's fresh form) appear and invade the Real World. Kuramon merges with Diaboromon to create a Super Ultimate level called Armageddemon. Though Omnimon and Imperialdramon fail to stop it, he gives his energy to Imperialdramon Fighter Mode, powering him up to Paladin Mode. Using his Omni Sword attack, Imperialdramon defeats Armageddemon, splitting him back up into Kuramon. With the power of the Digivices and cell phones, the Omni Sword is powered up, sending Kuramon back into the computer.

Digimon Adventure tri. series 

Digimon Adventure tri. is a six-part film series, taking place three years after the events of Digimon Adventure 02. When mysterious occurrences cause infected Digimon to appear in the real world, the original DigiDestined members face the changes that are happening in their own lives. Reunion was released in Japan on November 21, 2015, with an English dub version to be released in September 2016, Determination was released in Japan on March 12, 2016, and Confession released on September 24, 2016. Loss was released on February 25, 2017, Coexistence was released on September 30, 2017, and Future was released on May 5, 2018.

Digimon Adventure: Last Evolution Kizuna 

Digimon Adventure: Last Evolution Kizuna is a film to directed by Tomohisa Taguchi, written by Akatsuki Yamatoya, and animated by Yumeta Company.  Toei Animation is produced the movie.  It marked the 20th anniversary of the debut of Digimon Adventure and was released in Japan on February 21, 2020.

Digimon Tamers films

Battle of Adventurers 

Digimon Tamers: Battle of Adventurers is the fifth Digimon film. It was released in Japan on July 14, 2001. It was released in the United States on September 16, 2005.

Runaway Locomon 

Digimon Tamers: Runaway Locomon originally released in Japan as Digimon Tamers: Runaway Digimon Express, is the sixth Digimon film. It was released in Japan on March 2, 2002. It was released in the United States on October 2, 2005.

Chiaki Konaka states in his character notes (for Rika) that he "was not consulted" on Runaway Locomon, which possibly explains certain continuity errors. On this he also says: "However, ...Mr. Tetsuharu Nakamura [the director], [who was] an assistant director of the TV series... [and] Mr. Hiro Masaki,... a regular writer for the series... paid a great deal of attention to the psychological aspects of the series when completing the movie... I am very grateful to them for boldly illustrating the parts of Rika's family life that the TV series never explored."

Digimon Frontier films

Digimon Frontier: Island of Lost Digimon 

It was released in Japan on July 20, 2002. It was released in the United States on November 27, 2005.

Digimon Data Squad films

The Digital World in Imminent Danger! 

 is a 7-minute CG film produced by Toei Animation that was originally screened at the Time Machine of Dreams theme park attraction at Sanrio Puroland from July 8, 2006 to July 2, 2008, and Harmonyland. It made its theatrical debut on October 3, 2009, alongside Digimon Adventure 3D: Digimon Grandprix!, GeGeGe no Kitaro: Kitaro's Ghost Train and Yaemon, The Locomotive as part of the Burst Out! 3D Toei Anime Festival. It was released on DVD along with the other three films on February 21, 2010, under the name "CG Toei Anime Festival" and was later included on a bonus disc in the Digimon THE MOVIES Blu-ray 1999–2006 compilation, released on January 9, 2015.

Ultimate Power! Activate Burst Mode!! 

 is the ninth Digimon film. It was released on December 9, 2006, by Toei Animation based on the series Digimon Data Squad.

The plot revolves around Agumon, Gaomon and Lalamon, whose partners are put into an eternal sleep, along with the rest of the humans, because of a mysterious thorn that spread throughout the city. After saving Rhythm, a Digimon in the form of a young girl, they learn from her that the thorns are the work of an Ultimate Digimon, named Argomon, and the four set out for his castle to confront him.

Other films

Digital Monster X-Evolution 

 is the eighth Digimon film, and the first to air originally on Japanese television. It aired on January 3, 2005, at 7:15 am. UTC+9/JST on the Fuji TV network. On August 1, 2020, as part of DigiFes 2020, Toei Animation streamed Digital Monster X-Evolution on their YouTube channel, though it lacked subtitles.

It was based on the Digimon Chronicle merchandise line.

Digital Monster X-Evolution is also the first and, so far, only Digimon movie to be done entirely in CG (CG animation by Imagi Animation Studios), as well as the only Digimon movie not related to one of the Digimon anime series.

In the Digital World, the overpopulation of Digimon forces the world's creator, the supercomputer Yggdrasil to launch the X-Program which exterminates ninety-eight percent of all Digimon. Creating a smaller, new Digital World via Project Ark, Yggdrasil learns a small group of Digimon have gained a vaccine called the X-Antibody, that makes them immune to the X-Program, and upgrades them with new abilities and appearances. Yggdrasil dispatches its guards, the Royal Knights, to exterminate the X-Digimon. The Royal Knights consists of the merciless, loyal Omnimon, his best friend Gallantmon who questions Yggdrasil's motives, and the quiet Magnamon.

Dorumon, a dragon-like Digimon and X-Antibody carrier, does not understand the prejudice from other Digimon. He is targeted by a Leomon for his X-Antibody, but Leomon is struck by lightning and dies, asking Dorumon to live for him. Omnimon is summoned to a meeting between regular Digimon and X-Digimon, but he exterminates all of them save WarGreymon X and a Tokomon. The two crashland near a temple where Dorumon lives, WarGreymon X leaving Tokomon in Dorumon's care whilst he lures Omnimon away. Dorumon witnesses Omnimon exterminate a herd of Digimon who oppose Yggdrasil's will before being targeted himself. WarGreymon X and MetalGarurumon X arrive, but the latter is killed, though not before giving his X-Antibody to a wounded Tokomon.

Dorumon digivolves into his Champion-level Dorugamon, but Gallantmon arrives, revealing to Omnimon that Project Ark's second phase involves wiping out all Digimon, something which he refuses to participate in. Omnimon and Gallantmon duel, but Gallantmon allows himself to be killed so he can discern the truth, leaving Omnimon confused. Magnamon capture Dorugamon on Yggdrasil's command, revealing Dorumon is an experiment. Data is extracted from Dorugamon, used to create an army of DexDoruGreymon while Dorugamon is dumped in a wrecking yard where he is found by resistance members Mummymon and Wizardmon. Yggdrasil's horde attacks the group's base, but WarGreymon X and a revived MetalGarurumon X help protect it. Dorugamon awakens, digivolving into DoruGreymon, resembling the attacking horde. Gallantmon returns as an X-Digimon, opening a portal for DoruGreymon to confront Yggdrasil.

DoruGreymon confronts Magnamon and a disillusioned Omnimon. DoruGreymon digivolves into his Mega-level Alphamon, a legendary missing Royal Knight. Alphamon and Omnimon join forces to face Yggdrasil, but the loyal Magnamon warns his master of their arrival. In Yggdrasil's core, the Knights get nowhere with answers, and have to battle Alphamon's counterpart Dexmon. Alphamon impales himself and Dexmon using his own sword, and gives his X-Antibody to Omnimon, who successfully slays Yggdrasil. In the rebooted Digital World, Omnimon and Gallantmon muse over Yggdrasil's choices, concluding it merely wanted to live in the Digital World but it was too complex for it. Alphamon survives as Dorumon, reuniting with Tokomon.

References 

Films
Lists of anime films

Animated films based on animated series
Lists of films by franchise
20th Century Studios franchises